Rowing was contested at the 1987 Summer Universiade in Zagreb in Yugoslavia.

Medal summary

Medal table

Men's events

Women's events

External links
 Results on HickokSports.com
 Results on sports123.com

Universiade
1987 Summer Universiade